Guerrino Zanotti (born 15 August 1964) is a Sammarinese politician who served as a Captain Regent with Gianfranco Terenzi, from October 2014 to April 2015. He is also a member of the Grand and General Council. Zanotti has been a member of the Party of Socialists and Democrats since it was formed in 2005. He is married and has two sons. In 2016, Zanotti was re-elected to the Grand and General Council, and he became the Secretary of State for Internal Affairs.

References

1962 births
Captains Regent of San Marino
Members of the Grand and General Council
Living people
Party of Socialists and Democrats politicians